Fernand Dansereau  (born April 5, 1928) is a Québécois film director and film producer.

Biography
After five years working as a reporter for the Montreal daily Le Devoir, Dansereau joined the NFB in 1955. He was a founding member of the NFB's French Unit and until 1960, he wrote and directed several feature films and documentaries for the series Panorama. He worked on the television series Temps présent from 1960 to 1964 and then returned to directing with the fiction feature Le festin des morts which won 2 Canadian Film Awards including Best Feature Film in 1966. He left the NFB in 1970 for the private sector. Among his many achievements, he wrote and directed the feature documentary Faut aller parmi l'monde pour le savoir (1971) which was selected for the Directors' Fortnight at the Cannes Film Festival in 1972. His 1977 feature Thetford au milieu de notre vie (co-directed with Iolande Cadrin-Rossignol) about life in a Québécois mining town became another career highlight. His dramatic feature Doux aveux (1982) garnered 4 Genie Award nominations in 1983. Most recently Dansereau made the dramatic feature La brunante (2007) which was nominated for best film and best director at the 2008 Jutra Awards.

In 2005 he was awarded the Prix Albert-Tessier. In 2003 he received the Prix Lumière for his outstanding contribution to the profession and in 2009 received the Jutra Lifetime Achievement Award. In 2019, Dansereau was appointed as a Member of the Order of Canada and, in 2020, and Officer in the National Order of Quebec.

Selected filmography

Fiction
Le maître du Pérou - Short, 1958
Pays neuf - Short, 1958
La Canne à pêche - Short, 1959
Mission of Fear (Astataïon ou Le festin des morts) - 1965
This Is No Time for Romance (Ça n'est pas le temps des romans) - Short, 1966
Contrat d’amour - Short, 1973
Simple histoire d’amours (1974)
Thetford au milieu de notre vie - Co-Directed with Iolande Cadrin-Rossignol, 1978
Sweet Lies and Loving Oaths (Doux aveux) - 1982
Twilight (La Brunante) - 2007

Documentaries
La communauté juive de Montréal - 1956, short
Pierre Beaulieu, agriculteur - 1959, short
John Lyman, peintre - 1959, short
Les Administrateurs - 1960, co-directed with Jacques Godbout
Congrès - 1961, short co-directed with Jean Dansereau and Georges Dufaux
Éducation populaire - 1968, series of 30 shorts
Saint-Jerome - 1968
Jonquière - 1969, short
Québec ski - 1970, short
Tout le temps, tout le temps, tout le temps...? - 1970
Comité d’expression populaire - 1971
It Is Necessary to Be Among the Peoples of the World to Know Them (Faut aller parmi l'monde pour le savoir) - 1971
Vivre entre les mots - 1972
Quotidien series - 1975-77, series of 28 shorts co-directed with Iolande Cadrin-Rossignol
L’autre côté de la lune - 1994
Quelques raisons d’espérer - 2001
Hope Builders (Les porteurs d'espoir) - 2010

References

External links
 
 Watch films by Fernand Dansereau at NFB.ca

1928 births
Living people
Film directors from Montreal
Writers from Montreal
Canadian documentary film directors
Canadian documentary film producers
Canadian screenwriters in French
French Quebecers
National Film Board of Canada people
Prix Albert-Tessier winners
Members of the Order of Canada